"Get It Right" is a song by American DJ and record producer Diplo featuring Danish singer-songwriter MØ. It was released on November 15, 2017 from the album Major Lazer Presents: Give Me Future and Diplo's EP California. The song was written by Diplo, MØ, King Henry, Americo Garcia and Philip Meckseper.

Content
Joie Mitchell of Noiseporn said that the song "[is] the epitome of working hard and partying hard, and neither Diplo nor MØ can be held back from their successful destinies." The song is written in the key of C major, with a tempo of 160 beats per minute.

Critical reception
The website Mix247edm commented that the song "start[s] off with some basic piano cord when MØ's somewhat rugged but beautiful voice chimes in and sets the perfect tone for this uplifting track."

Music video
An accompanying music video was released on January 11, 2018, directed by Brantley Gutierrez and with choreography from Sara Bivens and Calvit Hodge. According to the description by Kat Bein of Billboard, the video features "a wonderfully awkward dance sequence between the two friends alone in a lavish palace room that's empty, save for a grand piano."

Remix
On February 2, 2018, a remix version with American rapper GoldLink was released.

Charts

Weekly charts

Year-end charts

Release history

References

2017 singles
2017 songs
Diplo songs
MØ songs
Songs written by Diplo
Songs written by MØ
Songs written by King Henry (producer)
Songs written by Jr Blender